The Sri Lanka cricket team toured England in the 1991 season to play an itinerary that included one test Test match against England.

England won the test by 137 runs.

Test series summary

External sources
 CricketArchive

References
 Playfair Cricket Annual 1992
 Wisden Cricketers' Almanack 1992

1991 in cricket
1991 in English cricket
1991
International cricket competitions from 1988–89 to 1991
1991 in Sri Lankan cricket